Eleni Daniilidou was the defending champion, but chose not to participate that year.

Petra Kvitová defeated Iveta Benešová in the final, 7–5, 6–1 for her maiden WTA title.

Seeds

Draw

Finals

Top half

Bottom half

References

External links
Draw

Singles
Hobart International – Singles